Blondes is a studio album released in 1982 by folk musician John Stewart, former member of the Kingston Trio. The LP was released with slightly different track listings in the US and in Sweden.

The liner notes of the US release states:

"This record is dedicated to John S. Stewart"

The Swedish album was released on Polydor and is credited to "John Stewart with Chuck McDermott". The Swedish release contains remixes of all the songs from the US release except "Angeles" which is not included at all. It also contains the following additional songs: "All The Desperate Men", "Same Old Heart" and "When The Night Was Ours".

Track listing (US release) 
All compositions by John Stewart.
 Side one
 "Tall Blondes" – 3:02
 "The Queen of Hollywood High" – 4:03
 "Girl Down the River" – 4:35
 "The Eyes of Sweet Virginia" – 3:52
 "Judy in G Major" – 3:57
 Side two
 "You Won't Be Going Home" – 3:52
 "Jenny was a Dream Girl" – 3:45
 "Blonde Star" – 4:02
 "Golden Gate" – 3:46
 "Angeles (City of The Angels)"* – 5:23
Running time: 40:17

(* denotes track not released on the Swedish release)

Track listing (Swedish release) 
All compositions by John Stewart.
 Side one
 "All the Desperate Men"* – 3:37
 "Tall Blondes" – 3:05
 "The Queen of Hollywood High" – 4:03
 "Girl Down the River" – 4:38
 "The Eyes of Sweet Virginia" – 4:04
 "Judy in G Major" – 3:55
 Side two
 "You Won't Be Going Home" – 3:55
 "Jenny was a Dream Girl" – 4:11
 "Same Old Heart"* – 3:55
 "When The Night was Ours"* – 3:06
 "Golden Gate" – 4:26
 "Blonde Star" – 4:07
Running time: 47:02

(* denotes tracks not released on the US release)

The Complete Blondes 
In 2003 John Stewart reissued all the tracks from both the US and the Swedish releases on a CD on his own label Neon Dreams.

 "Tall Blondes"
 "The Queen of Hollywood High"
 "Girl Down the River"
 "The Eyes of Sweet Virginia"
 "Judy in G Major"
 "You Won't Be Going Home"
 "Jenny Was a Dream Girl"
 "Blonde Star"
 "Golden Gate"
 "Angeles (The City of the Angels)"
 "All the Desperate Men"
 "Same Old Heart"
 "When the Night Was Ours"

Personnel 
 John Stewart – vocals, lead guitar, bass guitar
 Chuck McDermott – vocals, rhythm guitar
 Chris Whalen – bass guitar
 Roy Ohari – bass guitar
 Bill Mutter – drums, percussion
 Larry Greenstein – percussion
 Dennis Kenmore – percussion
 Lindsey Buckingham – background vocals on "Jenny was a Dream Girl"
 Linda Ronstadt – background vocals on "The Queen of Hollywood High"

Additional personnel
 Chuck McDermott – production assistant
 Larry Greenstein – recording
 Kim Harwood – front and back cover photographs

External links 
 John Stewart's Official Website

References 

1982 albums
John Stewart (musician) albums
Albums recorded at Shangri-La (recording studio)